Herbert Cook was an art historian.

Herbert Cook may also refer to:

Herbert Cook (rugby), rugby player
Herbert Bramwell Cook (1936–2017), New Zealand gastroenterologist
Herbert Cook (footballer), English footballer

See also
Herbert Cooke (disambiguation)
Bert Cook (disambiguation)